Because there are many factors that can lead to corruption in local government, it is hard to study corruption patterns empirically, but recently, improved research strategies and information sources have made such studies better.

Types
There are several types of political corruption that occur in local government. Some are more common than others, and some are more prevalent to local governments than to larger segments of government. Local governments may be more susceptible to corruption because interactions between private individuals and officials happen at greater levels of intimacy and with more frequency at more decentralized levels. Forms of corruption pertaining to money like bribery, extortion, embezzlement, and graft are found in local government systems. Other forms of political corruption are nepotism and patronage systems. One historical example was the Black Horse Cavalry a group of New York state legislators accused of blackmailing corporations.
 
 Bribery is the offering of something which is most often money but can also be goods or services in order to gain an unfair advantage. Common advantages can be to sway a person's opinion, action, or decision, reduce amounts fees collected, speed up a government grants, or change outcomes of legal processes. 
 Extortion is threatening or inflicting harm to a person, their reputation, or their property in order to unjustly obtain money, actions, services, or other goods from that person. Blackmail is a form of extortion.
 Embezzlement is the illegal taking or appropriation of money or property that has been entrusted to a person but is actually owned by another. In political terms this is called graft which is when a political office holder unlawfully uses public funds for personal purposes.
 Nepotism is the practice or inclination to favor a group or person who is a relative when giving promotions, jobs, raises, and other benefits to employees. This is often based on the concept of familism which is believing that a person must always respect and favor family in all situations including those pertaining to politics and business. This leads some political officials to give privileges and positions of authority to relatives based on relationships and regardless of their actual abilities.
 Patronage systems consist of the granting favors, contracts, or appointments to positions by a local public office holder or candidate for a political office in return for political support. Many times patronage is used to gain support and votes in elections or in passing legislation. Patronage systems disregard the formal rules of a local government and use personal instead of formalized channels to gain an advantage.

Demographic factors

Socioeconomic characteristics and the size of the population of people that make up a municipality can be encouraging factors for local government officials to engage in corrupt practices. Patterns of political corruption can be found in places that have a similar demographic make-up. Demographic factors that have been known to lead to or increase the likelihood of corruption in a local government system are religion, race, class, size of the municipality, local economic conditions, education, political culture, and gender. Some factors are interrelated or can lead to other factors which may cause more corruption.

Size of a municipality
Smaller municipalities may be more prone to experience corruption within their local government. These towns and villages nominate (or self-nominate) residents or officials to represent and run the local government, sometimes without oversight approval from higher levels of government. In a small community, personal opinions and relationships play a larger role in politics. Due to this, problems like nepotism or extortion can be prevalent. In addition, some local governments face another kind of disadvantage - lack of experience and professionalism from their representatives. It can be a challenge to attract qualified up and coming politicians to small towns. Another major issue in small municipalities lies with accountability - some have inadequate or insufficient structures for policing and prosecution of corrupt local officials, culminating in a difficult situation for those affected.

Condition of the local economy
Low economic development has been found to be an encouraging factor for political corruption. Economic practices like dependence on raw material industries and drug trades are characteristic of poorer cities and areas with increased amounts of corruption. Economic dependence on certain industries will also lead to less stable governments and less money available to fund governments. Fragile economies lead to increased levels of poverty and less opportunities to get out of poverty. Poverty is a known factor that encourages corruption in local governments. Places with failing economies and poverty sometimes get loans or start aid programs to support the local economy and the people, and public officials are often able to unlawfully take the money or goods for private gain. With less money available, local officials are more likely to get lower wages, which is seen as another factor that leads to corruption. Officials who get lower wages, which are not enough to provide for their necessities, will many times become corrupt and try something like embezzling money that may entrusted to them in the local treasury. Low wages can cause economic insecurity and encourage politicians to take advantage of current opportunities as public figures of authority. On the other hand, some researchers argue that the more money a local government has to spend, the more tendency it will have to do so inefficiently, which can lead to suspicions of corruption. Overall, poorer municipalities are more often perceived to have corrupt local governments than rich ones.

Education
Lower levels of education which are often caused by poverty are seen as a factor which encourages corrupt government practices. Those with less education are not as informed as to how the government works or what rights they have under the government. It is easier for corrupt office-holders to conceal corrupt activities from a poorly educated public. Uneducated citizens are less likely to be aware of corruption in local governments or how to stop it, and therefore, corruption is able to remain and spread. Without some kind of political awareness, citizens will not know which candidates to elect that are honest or dishonest or other ways to prevent corruption from taking place in their local governments. This often leads municipalities to be continually governed by one or more corrupt local officials who use patronage or nepotistic practices to stay in office or keep influence in the government for long periods of time. When local political leaders are less educated, they will be less likely to find legitimate ways to make the municipality well-structured, productive, and successful.

Political culture of municipality
Many local governments have an established political culture with certain expectations and practices that often determine what is seen as acceptable and not acceptable in local politics. In municipalities with an undeveloped or underdeveloped political culture, accountability and legitimacy is usually low and principles of ethics in government are not established. This can encourage corruption to take hold in the local government because citizens do not know what is considered corrupt, and local officials are not afraid to be corrupt because of the low accountability.In some places the local governments have been corrupt for so long that the citizens think that is how it is supposed to work because that is all they have been exposed to. Long periods of political instability will also lead to corruption in the government because people are unsure of how the government should operate, and thus do not know what practices are corrupt or how to stop them if they are corrupt.

Links and references

Academic references

 The Causes of Corruption: A Cross-National Study, Daniel Treisman, Department of Political Science, University of California
 Consequences and Causes of Corruption – What do We Know from a Cross-Section of Countries?, Johann Graf Lambsdorff
 A Handbook on Fighting Corruption, CENTER FOR DEMOCRACY AND GOVERNANCE, U.S. Agency for International Development

Web references
 Corruption and Development, CHERYL W. GRAY AND DANIEL KAUFMANN 
 Transparency Internat’l

Footnotes

Political corruption
Local government